Gethin Rhys Williams (born 23 February 1980 in Cardiff) is a Welsh rugby union player who played for Cardiff Blues and won 44 caps for the Wales national rugby union team as a full-back and winger. During the 2005-2006 season Williams was the captain of the Cardiff Blues.

Educated at Ysgol Iolo Morganwg (the Welsh-medium primary school in Cowbridge) and Cowbridge Comprehensive School, Rhys Williams is a versatile back, who has played at wing, centre and full back for Cardiff Blues, although full-back is his preferred position. He played here when helping Cardiff RFC win the Welsh-Scottish League title in 1999-2000.

He represented Wales at all age levels from Under 16 to Under 21, and played in the Youth World Cup in 1999 when Wales reached the final, losing to New Zealand along with fellow Cardiff Blues player Jamie Robinson. He made his debut for the full national side in a Six Nations Championship match against Ireland in Dublin in 2000, playing at full-back.

In the early part of the 2005 Six Nations, Williams was out of the Wales side with thumb ligament damage, but came on as a substitute against France when Gareth Thomas was injured. He did well enough to earn a place in the starting lineup as a winger in the following match against Scotland, with Kevin Morgan moving to full-back. Williams scored two tries, including an 80-metre effort following an interception. He missed the final match of the campaign against Ireland through injury.

Testimonial

In the 2007/2008 season, Rhys Williams celebrated a testimonial year, having spent 10 seasons playing for Cardiff.

References

External links
 Cardiff profile

1980 births
Living people
Rugby union players from Cardiff
Wales international rugby union players
Rugby union fullbacks
Rugby union wings
Commonwealth Games rugby sevens players of Wales
Cardiff Rugby players
Cardiff RFC players
Rugby sevens players at the 2006 Commonwealth Games